John G. Morgan (born January 4, 1952) is an American politician who served as the 33rd Comptroller of the Treasury of Tennessee from 1999 to 2008.

Early years 
Morgan was born in Nashville, Tennessee, and attended college at Austin Peay State University.

Career

Politics 
In January 1999, the Tennessee General Assembly elected Morgan to be the state's 33rd Comptroller of the Treasury.

In January 2009, Morgan was appointed as Deputy to Governor Phil Bredesen.

In October 2010, the Tennessee Board of Regents selected Morgan as Chancellor.

References 

1952 births
21st-century American politicians
Living people
Politicians from Nashville, Tennessee
Comptrollers of the Treasury of Tennessee
Tennessee Democrats